Andrew Richard Ogle (born 16 February 1989) is a retired English mixed martial artist, who formerly competed in the Featherweight division of the Ultimate Fighting Championship. A professional MMA competitor since 2009, Ogle has made a name for himself fighting for numerous promotions all over England. He was a competitor on FX's The Ultimate Fighter: Live.

Background
Ogle was born in Newcastle upon Tyne to Jan and Gordon Ogle. He was raised in Tynemouth, North Tyneside, and attended Marden High School where he competed in football and also trained mixed martial arts. At the age of 16, Ogle worked as an instructor for his gym, teaching the younger children MMA. Upon leaving Marden, Ogle enrolled at the University of Sunderland. Ogle graduated from Sunderland in 2011 with a degree in sports science.

Mixed martial arts career

Early career
In 2008 Ogle began his semi-professional (amateur) career, posting five straight wins before taking a TKO loss in his final semi-pro fight. After boasting a 5-1 semi-pro record, Ogle turned professional in late 2009. His pro debut came on 18 October 2009 against Graham Armstrong, another fighter making his pro debut. Ogle dominated the fight for three rounds, and was awarded the unanimous decision victory. Only a month later, in his second fight, Ogle lost to Bobby McVittie via submission after getting caught in a triangle choke in the first round. Ogle bounced back from the loss with three straight submission wins, all coming via rear-naked choke, and two of the submission wins coming in the first round.

Ogle dominated three more opponents, earning a record of 7-1 before being offered a fight with Shay Walsh, an undefeated fighter at the time considered the top featherweight prospect in the UK. Ogle upset Walsh, winning the fight via unanimous decision.

The Ultimate Fighter
In February 2012, it was revealed that Ogle was selected to be a participant on The Ultimate Fighter: Live. Ogle defeated Brendan Weafer via unanimous decision to move into the Ultimate Fighter house, and become an official cast member.

Ogle was selected seventh (fourteenth overall) by Urijah Faber to become a part of Team Faber. In the last quarter-final fight of the season, Ogle was selected to fight one of Team Cruz's best fighters in Mike Rio. Ogle earned the upset victory after submitting Rio with a rear-naked choke in the second round.

In the semi-final round Ogle was chosen to fight Team Faber teammate, Al Iaquinta. Ogle lost the fight via TKO in the closing moments of the first round, eliminating him from the competition.

Ultimate Fighting Championship
Despite not winning the show, UFC President Dana White decided to sign all sixteen cast members to exclusive UFC contracts. Ogle was linked to a bout at The Ultimate Fighter 15 Finale on 1 June 2012. However, due to being medically suspended after his KO loss to Al Iaquinta in quarter-finals of the show, Ogle was not able to compete on the card.

Ogle lost in his UFC debut to Akira Corassani via split decision on 29 September 2012 at UFC on Fuel TV 5. There was a lot of displeasure with the decision as many spectators and MMA website columnists believed Ogle had won the fight.

Ogle would then fought former featherweight title contender, Josh Grispi, on 16 February 2013 at UFC on Fuel TV: Barão vs. McDonald. After three rounds, Ogle won the fight via unanimous decision.

Ogle was expected to face Conor McGregor on 17 August 2013 at UFC Fight Night 26  However, Ogle pulled out of the bout due an injury and was replaced by Max Holloway

Ogle faced Cole Miller on 26 October 2013 at UFC Fight Night 30. He lost the fight via unanimous decision.

Ogle faced Charles Oliveira on 15 February 2014 at UFC Fight Night 36. He lost the fight via triangle choke submission in the third round.

Ogle faced Maximo Blanco on 31 May 2014 at UFC Fight Night 41. He lost the fight by unanimous decision.

Ogle next faced UFC newcomer Makwan Amirkhani on 24 January 2015 at UFC on Fox 14. He lost the fight via TKO only 8 seconds into the first round, and was subsequently released from the promotion shortly after the fight.

Mixed martial arts record

|-
|Loss
|align=center|9–6
|Makwan Amirkhani
|TKO (flying knee and punches)
|UFC on Fox: Gustafsson vs. Johnson
|
|align=center|1
|align=center|0:08
|Stockholm, Sweden
|
|-
|Loss
|align=center|9–5
|Maximo Blanco
|Decision (unanimous)
|UFC Fight Night: Munoz vs. Mousasi
|
|align=center|3
|align=center|5:00
|Berlin, Germany
|
|-
|Loss
|align=center|9–4
|Charles Oliveira
|Submission (triangle choke)
|UFC Fight Night: Machida vs. Mousasi
|
|align=center|3
|align=center|2:40
|Jaraguá do Sul, Brazil
|
|-
|Loss
|align=center|9–3
|Cole Miller
|Decision (unanimous)
|UFC Fight Night: Machida vs. Munoz
|
|align=center|3
|align=center|5:00
|Manchester, England
|
|-
|Win
|align=center|9–2
|Josh Grispi
|Decision (unanimous)
|UFC on Fuel TV: Barão vs. McDonald
|
|align=center|3
|align=center|5:00
|London, England
|
|-
|Loss
|align=center|8–2
|Akira Corassani
|Decision (split)
|UFC on Fuel TV: Struve vs. Miocic
|
|align=center|3
|align=center|5:00
|Nottingham, England
|
|-
|Win
|align=center|8–1
|Shay Walsh
|Decision (unanimous)
|Olympian MMA 12
|
|align=center|3
|align=center|5:00
|Liverpool, England
|
|-
|Win
|align=center|7–1
|Antanas Jazbutis
|TKO (punches)
|Supremacy Fight Challenge 3
|
|align=center|3
|align=center|3:08
|Gateshead, England
|
|-
|Win
|align=center|6–1
|Stewart Gillham
|TKO (punches)
|Supremacy Fight Challenge 2
|
|align=center|2
|align=center|2:29
|Gateshead, England
|
|-
|Win
|align=center|5–1
|Jay Furness
|Decision (unanimous)
|Supremacy Fight Challenge 1
|
|align=center|3
|align=center|5:00
|Gateshead, England
|
|-
|Win
|align=center|4–1
|Phil Flynn
|Submission (rear-naked choke)
|Knuckle Up MMA 8
|
|align=center|2
|align=center|1:54
|Bolton, England
|
|-
|Win
|align=center|3–1
|Matt Eynon
|Submission (rear-naked choke)
|Strike and Submit 15
|
|align=center|1
|align=center|N/A
|Gateshead, England
|
|-
|Win
|align=center|2–1
|Nigel Wright
|Submission (rear-naked choke)
|Strike and Submit 14
|
|align=center|1
|align=center|1:31
|Gateshead, England
|
|-
|Loss
|align=center|1–1
|Bobby McVittie
|Submission (triangle choke)
|Absolute Combat 2
|
|align=center|1
|align=center|1:33
|Edinburgh, Scotland
|
|-
|Win
|align=center|1–0
|Graham Armstrong
|Decision (unanimous)
|Cage Kombat 11
|
|align=center|3
|align=center|5:00
|Edinburgh, Scotland
|
|}

Personal life
As of 2016, Ogle works as a prison guard in Newcastle, England.

See also
 List of male mixed martial artists

References

External links
 
 

Living people
1989 births
English male mixed martial artists
Lightweight mixed martial artists
Featherweight mixed martial artists
Alumni of the University of Sunderland
Ultimate Fighting Championship male fighters